Golam Mortaza (born 23 May 1980) is a Bangladeshi former first-class and List A cricketer from Rajshahi. He played as a wicket-keeper and lower order right-handed batsman. He made his first-class debut for Chittagong Division in 2000–01 then moved to Rajshahi Division and finally appeared for Sylhet Division in 2005–06. He took 68 catches and completed 12 stumpings in the first-class game and recorded one half century with the bat.

References

Bangladeshi cricketers
Chittagong Division cricketers
Rajshahi Division cricketers
Sylhet Division cricketers
Living people
1980 births
Bangladeshi cricket coaches
Wicket-keepers